Sonnenstein is a municipality in the district of Eichsfeld, Thuringia, Germany. It was formed by the merger of the previously independent municipalities Bockelnhagen, Holungen, Jützenbach, Silkerode, Steinrode, Stöckey, Weißenborn-Lüderode and Zwinge, on 1 December 2011. These municipalities had previously been part of the Verwaltungsgemeinschaft Eichsfeld-Südharz, which was disbanded. The seat of the municipality is in the village Weißenborn-Lüderode. The municipality consists of 8 Ortschaften (municipal divisions): Bockelnhagen (villages Bockelnhagen and Weilrode), Holungen, Jützenbach, Silkerode, Steinrode (villages Werningerode and Epschenrode), Stöckey, Weißenborn-Lüderode and Zwinge.

References